The 2020–21 Mid-American Conference women's basketball season began with practices in October 2020, followed by the start of the 2020–21 NCAA Division I women's basketball season in November. Conference play began in January 2021 and concluded in March 2021. In a season limited due to the ongoing COVID-19 pandemic,   won the MAC regular season championship with a conference record of 14–4. Ohio's Cece Hooks was named MAC player of the year. Second seeded  won the MAC tournament with a 77–72 win over Bowling Green.  Micaela Kelly was named the tournament MVP. With the automatic bid, Central Michigan was the only MAC school to qualify for the NCAA tournament where they lost to Iowa in the first round.
Bowling Green and Ohio accepted bids to the WNIT. Both lost in the first round.

Preseason Awards
The preseason coaches' poll and league awards were announced by the league office on November 19, 2020.

Preseason women's basketball coaches poll
(First place votes in parenthesis)
  (10) 142
 Ohio 128 
 Ball State (1) 119
  (1) 108
  94 
  88 
  71 
  42 
  41 
  39 
  38 
  28

Tournament Champion: Central Michigan (6), Ohio (3), Buffalo (1), Ball State (1), EMU (1)

Honors

Postseason

Mid–American Tournament

Postseason Awards

Coach of the Year: Robyn Fralick, Bowling Green
Player of the Year: Cece Hooks, Ohio
Freshman of the Year: Lexi Fleming, Bowling Green
Defensive Player of the Year: Cece Hooks, Ohio
Sixth Player of the Year: Janae Poisson, NIU

Honors

See also
2020–21 Mid-American Conference men's basketball season

References